The following is a list of pine barrens.

Canada
Kaladar Jack Pine Barrens in Ontario

United States
 Kentucky
Hi Lewis Pine Barrens State Nature Preserve
 Maine
Waterboro Barrens Preserve
Hollis Plains
 Massachusetts
Plymouth Pinelands
 New Hampshire
Ossipee Pine Barrens
Concord Pine Barrens
 New Jersey
Pine Barrens
 New York
Albany Pine Bush
Altona Flat Rock Jack Pine Barrens
Long Island Central Pine Barrens
Rome Sand Plains
Shawangunk Ridge
 Pennsylvania
Long Pond Barrens
Scotia Barrens
 Rhode Island
Kingston Pine Barrens
 West Virginia
North Fork Mountain
 Wisconsin
Great Lakes Barrens
Moquah Barrens Research Natural Area
Northwest Wisconsin Pine Barrens
Gotham Jack Pine Barrens
Spread Eagle Barrens
 Virginia
Zuni Pine Barrens

Nature-related lists
Ecoregions